Luis Manuel Galano is a Paralympic athlete from Cuba competing mainly in category T13 sprint events.

He competed in the 2008 Summer Paralympics in Beijing, China.  There he won a gold medal in the men's 400 metres - T13 event and finished fourth in the men's 200 metres - T13 event

External links
 

Paralympic athletes of Cuba
Athletes (track and field) at the 2008 Summer Paralympics
Paralympic gold medalists for Cuba
Cuban male sprinters
Living people
Year of birth missing (living people)
Medalists at the 2008 Summer Paralympics
Paralympic medalists in athletics (track and field)
Medalists at the 2015 Parapan American Games